Garadice Lough, also known as Garadice Lake or Lough Garadice, is a freshwater lake in County Leitrim, Ireland. It is located in the south of the county and now forms part of the Shannon–Erne Waterway.

Geography
The lake has three islands, two of which are named: Church Island and Cherry Island (Irish: Cloch-inse-na-dtorc).

Hydrology
Garadice Lough now forms part of the Shannon–Erne Waterway. Its inflow was formerly named the Yellow River and the outflow was the Woodford River (Irish: Sruth Gráinne, meaning 'the Gravelly Stream' or 'the Gravelly River'; also anglicised as the River Gráinne or the Graine River). The Woodford River flows out of Little Garadice Lake, which is on the eastern edge of Garadice Lough, with the river flowing north-eastwards via Ballyconnell, eventually emptying into Upper Lough Erne near Teemore in the south of County Fermanagh.

Natural history
Fish present in Garadice Lough include tench, roach, bream and pike. Large pike have been caught here weighing  or more.

Ecology
The water quality was reported to be satisfactory  with a mesotrophic rating, improving to oligotrophic status , before dropping back to mesotrophic rating . Zebra mussel infestation is present. The ecology of Garadice Lough, and other Irish waterways, remains threatened by curly waterweed, and freshwater clam invasive species.

History
The earliest surviving mention of the lake is in the 9th century Vita tripartita Sancti Patricii, in connection with the crossing of the lake by Saint Patrick on his way to destroy the idol Crom Cruach. In medieval times Garadice Lough was known as Lough Finvoy (Irish: Loch Finn Mhagh, meaning 'The Lake of the White Plain'). The lake is mentioned several times in the Irish Annals- Annals of the Four Masters 1386 and Annals of Connacht 1257 & 1418. In about 1257 the fortress "Cloch-inse-na-dtorc, in Lough Finvoy, was burned by O'Rourke" (a King of West Breifne).

See also
List of loughs in Ireland

References and notes

Notes

Primary sources

Secondary sources

Garadice